Jhalar is a village and deh in Badin taluka of Badin District, Sindh. As of 2017, it has a population of 1,713, in 334 households. It is part of the tapedar circle of Pano.

References 

Populated places in Badin District